Christine-Isabel Boudrias (born September 3, 1972 in Montreal, Quebec) is a Canadian short track speed skater who competed in the 1994 Winter Olympics and in the 1998 Winter Olympics.

She was a member of the Canadian 3000 m relay team which won silver in 1994, and bronze during the 1998 Winter Olympics.

External links
 profile

1972 births
Living people
Canadian female short track speed skaters
Olympic short track speed skaters of Canada
Olympic silver medalists for Canada
Olympic bronze medalists for Canada
Olympic medalists in short track speed skating
Short track speed skaters at the 1994 Winter Olympics
Short track speed skaters at the 1998 Winter Olympics
Medalists at the 1994 Winter Olympics
Medalists at the 1998 Winter Olympics
Speed skaters from Montreal
20th-century Canadian women